The Second Book of Fritz Leiber is a collection of short stories and articles by American writer Fritz Leiber. It was first published in paperback in January 1975 by DAW Books. It was later gathered together with The Book of Fritz Leiber into the hardcover omnibus collection The Book of Fritz Leiber, Volume I & II (Gregg Press, 1980).

The book consists of five fantasy, science fiction and horror short stories alternating with six related articles, together with a foreword by the author. Some pieces were original to the collection. Others were originally published in the magazines Astounding Science Fiction for September 1950, Science Digest for April 1961, Mike Shayne Mystery Magazine for February 1961, and The Arkham Sampler for Spring 1948, and the anthology Science Fiction Thinking Machines (1954).

Contents
"Foreword"
"The Lion and the Lamb" (1950)
"The Mighty Tides" (1961)
"Trapped in the Sea of Stars"
"Fafhrd and Me" (1963)
"Belsen Express"
"Ingmar Bergman: Fantasy Novelist" (1974)
"Scream Wolf" (1961)
"Those Wild Alien Words: II"
"The Mechanical Bride" (1954)
"Through Hyperspace with Brown Jenkin" (1963)
"A Defense of Werewolves" (1948)

Awards
The collection won the 1976 British Fantasy Award for Best Short Story. The story "Belsen Express" won the 1976 World Fantasy Award for Best Short Fiction.

References

External links
 Fantastic Fiction entry

1975 short story collections
Fantasy short story collections
Science fiction short story collections
Horror short story collections
Short story collections by Fritz Leiber
Essay collections
DAW Books books